The discography of Cave In, an American rock band, consists of seven studio albums, two live albums, two compilation albums, seven EPs, three singles, three splits, eight compilation contributions and three music videos. Cave In formed in 1995 in Methuen, Massachusetts, where thereafter they began releasing several split singles and demos that eventually culminated in the 1998 compilation album Beyond Hypothermia. Cave In's first studio album, Until Your Heart Stops, was released later in 1998 through Hydra Head Records. These early releases from the band are often considered important albums in developing the metalcore genre. The band gradually began to move away from heavy metal and took a more alternative rock and progressive rock approach to their music beginning in 1999 with the EP Creative Eclipses. This new direction continued with Jupiter, Cave In's second studio album in 2000.  Cave In released one more EP through Hydra Head Records in 2002, Tides of Tomorrow, before signing with RCA Records.

Cave In's signing with RCA Records proved to be the band's most commercially successful. In 2003, they released their third studio album, Antenna, which became their only album to chart on the Billboard 200, which peaked at number 169. The single "Anchor" off Antenna received some minor radio success, and ranked on the Billboard Alternative Songs chart at number 34. Cave In began working on demo tracks in 2004 that were more in the vein of the band's earlier heavy metal albums. The demos were presented to RCA, but the label refused to fund the recording of a full-length album of that style. Cave In was subsequently dropped from the label, but granted the rights to their new material. The band re-signed to Hydra Head Records, and released Perfect Pitch Black in 2005. One common lyrical theme found in many of the songs on Perfect Pitch Black was the band's feelings of frustration toward their stint on RCA. Perfect Pitch Black became the band's final release before going on an indefinite hiatus in 2006.

Cave In reformed in 2009 and continued releasing material. Their first new release was the EP Planets of Old which was originally made available at their reunion show. In 2010, Cave In started releasing albums in their Anomalies project consisting of previously unreleased or rare songs. The series began with Anomalies Vol. 2, which was a full recording of a 2003 live performance from Italy. This was followed by Anomalies, Vol. 1, a compilation of B-sides and other rarities. A new studio album titled White Silence was released in 2011.

Albums

Studio albums

Compilations
{|class="wikitable"
! Year
! width="200"| Album details
! Notes
|-
| 1998
| Beyond Hypothermia
 Released: February 1998
 Label: Hydra Head (HH666-25)
| A compilation of Cave In's early demos and split singles. Some of the guitar and vocal parts of the tracks were re-recorded for Beyond Hypothermia. Because it was the first full-length album by the band, Beyond Hypothermia was often confused for Cave In's first studio album.
|-
| 2001
| The Sacrifice Poles
 Released: 2001
 Label: Robodog Records 
| Studio demos and jams recorded during Jupiter sessions of 1998-2000. Released on CD in 2001, digital and vinyl 2014.
|-
| 2010
| Anomalies, Vol. 1
 Released: December 14, 2010
 Label: Hydra Head (HH666-201)
| A compilation of B-sides, rarities and previously unreleased or hard to find tracks by Cave In.
|-

|}

Live albums
{|class="wikitable"
! Year
! width="200"| Album details
! colspan="3"| Notes
|-
| 2005
| Live Airwaves
 Released: April 2004
 Label: Magic Bullet (MBL067)
| Limited to 1,000 copies; sold exclusively at Cave In live shows and via mailorder. There were 34 copies numbered for Macrock 2004 attendees.
|-
| 2010
| Anomalies Vol. 2
 Released: August 7, 2010
 Label: Self-released
| Anomalies Vol. 2 was recorded at Mazda Palace in Milan, Italy on October 27, 2003 while Cave In was touring internationally in support of Antenna. The self-released live album was originally made available in a limited edition CD format sold on tour with Boris and Russian Circles beginning on August 7, 2010.
|-
| 2018
| Live at Roadburn 2018
 Released: November 2018
 Label: Roadburn Records
|
|}

Splits
{|class="wikitable"
! Year
! width="200"| Album details
! Notes
|-
| 1996
| Cave In / Gambit
 Released: Early 1996
 Label: Son of Sam
| Cave In's first release. Recorded with Brian McTernan at his Salad Days Studio in December 1995. Cave In contributed the song "Flypaper."
|-
| 1996
| Are We Still Fixable?
 Released: Late 1996
 Label: Independence Day (1)
 Split with: Early Grace
| Recorded with Brian McTernan in April 1996 along with Cave In / Piebald. Cave In contributed the songs "Stoic" and "Mitigate."
|-
| 1996
| Cave In / Piebald
 Released: Late 1996
 Label: Moo Cow (21)
 Split with: Piebald
| Recorded with Brian McTernan in April 1996 along with Are We Still Fixable?. Cave In contributed the song "Programmed Behind."
|-

|}

EPs
{|class="wikitable"
! Year
! width="200"| Album details
! Notes
|-
| 1997
| Cave In
 Released: May 1997
 Label: Hydra Head (HH666-19)
| Recorded with Brian McTernan at his Salad Days Studio in the winter of 1996/1997. Contained the tracks "Crossbearer" and "Chameleon." This is the final release with bassist Justin Matthes and vocalist Jay Frechette, and the first stand-alone release after several split and compilation appearances.
|-
| 1999
| Creative Eclipses
 Released: May 20, 1999
 Label: Hydra Head (HH666-38)
| "Although very much in the [heavy] metal mould the first Cave In album would provide the pivot for a complete overhaul in the acts sound with the follow-up EP Creative Eclipses dispensing with riffs and introducing folk and ambient sounds."
|-
| 2000
| Moons of Jupiter
 Released: December 18, 2000
 Label: Magic Bullet (MB011)
| A four-song EP containing alternative versions of songs from Jupiter. It was limited to 3,300 copies, and sold exclusively during 2000–2001 tours. The remix of the song "Jupiter" was performed by Brian McTernan. Impressed with the way it turned out, Cave In expressed their interest in remixing all of Jupiter in this manner.
|-
| 2002
| Epicenter
 Released: July 10, 2002
 Label: BMG (28008)
| A five-song EP containing tracks recorded during and after the Jupiter sessions. Some were later reworked into tracks on Antenna. This EP was originally exclusively released in Japan.
|-
| 2002
| Tides of Tomorrow
 Released: October 15, 2002
 Label: Hydra Head (HH666-66)
| Tides of Tomorrow was a continuation of the new sound Cave In displayed with Jupiter, and was also noted for its use of acoustic guitar in addition to electric instruments. The EP was released through Hydra Head shortly after it had been announced that Cave In signed to RCA Records. It peaked at number 3 on the UK Top 50 Budget Albums.
|-
| 2003
| untitled EP
 Released: August 2003
 Label: Self-released
| Sometimes referred to as Bootleg EP or Lollapalooza EP, the untitled EP was given out for free during live shows in 2003 beginning with their Lollapalooza performance. Two of the songs, "Down the Drain" and "Droned" were later included on the band's fourth studio album, Perfect Pitch Black. Cave In's cover of Codeine's "Cave-In" from this EP was released on Japanese versions of Perfect Pitch Black, and later on Anomalies Vol. 1.
|-
| 2009
| Planets of Old
 Released: July 19, 2009
 Label: Hydra Head (HH666-184)
| Cave In's first release after reforming in 2009. Planets of Old was originally released at Cave In's reunion show on July 19, 2009 as a vinyl LP. The EP was later reissued in 2010 on CD with a bonus DVD of their reunion performance.
|-
| 2013
| untitled EP
 January 2013
 Label: Coextinction (13)
| Sometimes referred to as Coextinction Release 13, the digital-only EP features the demo versions "Dark Driving" from Tides of Tomorrow, and "Joy Opposites" and "Anchor" from Antenna. The tracks were recorded in 2002 while touring with Foo Fighters in Europe. All proceeds from the EP were donated towards rebuilding Translator Audio, a recording studio from Brooklyn, New York that was destroyed by Hurricane Sandy. Cave In recorded some songs from Perfect Pitch Black at Translator Audio.
|}

Songs

Singles
{|class="wikitable"
! Year
! width="200"| Single details
! Notes
|-
| 2001
| "Lost in the Air"
 Released: October 2001
 Label: Hydra Head (HH666-49)
| Contains "Lift Off" on the B-side. Cave In recorded the two tracks after touring with A Perfect Circle in 2001, and released them on a 7" vinyl in October of that year. The song was later re-recorded for Antenna.
|-
| 2003
| "Anchor"
 Released: May 24, 2003
 Label: RCA (522982, 522992)
| Cave In's first song, and only to date, to chart as a radio single. The song peaked on Billboard's Alternative Songs at number 34 and on the UK Singles Chart at number 53. It was originally released on their 2003 album Antenna. Version 1 has the B-sides "Minus World," "Devil's Pinata Head," and the "Anchor" music video. Version 2 has "Lift Off" and "Stained Silver" (live).
|-
| 2005
| "Shapeshifter/Dead Already"
 Released: November 27, 2005
 Label: Hydra Head (HH666-109)
| In 2005, members of Cave In collaborated with Converge drummer Ben Koller. Two songs, "Shapeshifter" and "Dead Already," were recorded and released on a limited edition cassette single that was sold during 2005–2006 tours.
|-
|}

Other appearances
The following Cave In songs were released on compilation albums, soundtracks, and other releases. This is not an exhaustive list; songs that were first released on the band's albums, EPs, and split releases are not included.
{|class="wikitable"
! Year
! Appeared on
! Contributed song
|-
| 1997
| Between a Rock and a Hard Place
 Released: Early 1997
 Label: Witching Hour (WHR 002)
| "Pivotal"
|-
| 1998
| Flowercore
 Released: 1998
 Label: Hot Sauce
| "Juggernaut" (early version)
|-
| 1999
| In These Black Days
 Released: Late 1999
 Label: Hydra Head (HH666-16)
| "N.I.B." (originally by Black Sabbath)
|-
| 1999
| Never Give In: A Tribute to Bad Brains
 Released: August 24, 1999
 Label: Century Media (7977)
| "I Luv I Jah" (originally by Bad Brains)
|-
| 2000
| Disintegrated: A Tribute to The Cure
 Released: August 24, 2000
 Label: Too Damn Hype (38)
| "Plainsong" (originally by The Cure)
|-
| 2002
| Plea for Peace/Take Action, Vol. 2
 Released: August 20, 2002
 Label: Sub City (22)
| "Devil's Head Pinata"
|-
| 2003
| Buddyhead Presents: Gimme Skelter
 Released: October 21, 2003
 Label: Nettwerk (30321)
| "Harmless Armless / Minus World"
|-
| 2007
| Plea for Peace, Vol. 2
 Released: April 24, 2007
 Label: Asian Man (148)
| "Dead Already" (live)
|-
| 2015
| Whatever Nevermind
 Released: April 18, 2015
 Label: Robotic Empire
| "Breed" (originally by Nirvana)
|-
|}

Music videos
{|class="wikitable"
! Year
! Song
! Director
! Album
|-
| 2003
| "Anchor"
| align="center"|Dean Karr
| rowspan="2"| Antenna
|-
| rowspan="2"|2004
| "Inspire"
| align="center"|Gavin Bowden
|-
| "Dark Driving"
| align="center"| —
| Tides of Tomorrow
|-
| rowspan="4"|2022
| "New Reality"
| align="center"|Michael Gilday
| rowspan="4"|Heavy Pendulum
|-
| "Blinded by a Blaze"
| align="center"| —
|-
| "Blood Spiller"
| Jordan Olds and Drew Kaufman
|-
| "Reckoning"
| align="center"|Jay Zucco
|}

Notes

A  Final Transmission did not enter the Billboard 200, but peaked at no. 84 on the Top Album Sales chart.
B  Denotes a release that was later added to the compilation album Beyond Hypothermia.
C  The "Lost in the Air" single is sometimes inversely referred to as the "Lift Off" single with "Lost in the Air" as a B-side.
D  The music video for "Dark Driving" features clips of live performances, and thus had no director. It was released two years after its derivative album, Tides of Tomorrow, on the bonus DVD packaged with special editions of Antenna.
E  Denotes a song, or a release containing a song, that was later added to the compilation album Anomalies Vol. 1.
F  The music video for "Blinded by a Blaze" features clips of a live performance at the Saint Vitus Bar in Brooklyn that was shot and edited by Frank Huang. The video contains additional footage that was shot in Massachusetts by Cave In along with test LP shots by Drew Juergens.

References

External links
Cave In at Discogs
Cave In at Rate Your Music

 
Heavy metal group discographies
Post-hardcore group discographies
Discographies of American artists